Rough pasture is non-intensive grazing pasture, commonly found on poor soils, especially in hilly areas, throughout the world.

External links
Hill Plan Examples, Macaulay Institute, Aberdeen, Scotland

Livestock